The Hofmann Building, also known as the Harvester Building, is an historic building located in downtown Ottumwa, Iowa, United States. It was designed by the Des Moines architectural firm of Proudfoot, Rawson, Brooks & Borg. Hofmann Drug was located on this corner until it was destroyed in a fire. This building's construction utilized then modern fire safety codes when it was built to replace the old Hofman Drug. It became known as the Harvester building in the 1980s. Beginning in 2008 the building was converted into apartments. It was listed on the National Register of Historic Places in 2010.

References

Office buildings completed in 1941
Buildings and structures in Ottumwa, Iowa
Office buildings on the National Register of Historic Places in Iowa
National Register of Historic Places in Wapello County, Iowa
Modernist architecture in Iowa